Yang Gi-tak (April 2, 1871 – April 20, 1938) was one of the leaders of Korean independence movement who served as the 9th president of the Provisional Government of the Republic of Korea from 1933 to 1935.

Korea Daily News

In 1904, Yang and British journalist Ernest Bethell first published Daehan Maeil Sinbo, the newspaper which took an antagonistic views about Japanese reign. The paper illuminated many Koreans who were unaware of the problem, and also played a key role in leading the National Debt Repayment Movement.

New People's Association

In 1907, Yang played a key role in organizing the New People's Association to promote industry and Korean independence.

Notes

1871 births
1938 deaths
Korean independence activists

Officials of the Korean Empire